Paulo Jorge Gomes Pereira (born 18 January 1993) is a Portuguese footballer who plays as a midfielder for S.C. Espinho. He previously played at fully professional level for Blackburn Rovers and Gaz Metan Mediaș.

Club career
Born in Braga, Jorge spent his youth career with S.C. Braga's youth team and F.C. Porto's youth team. on 27 July 2012, he signed for English club Blackburn Rovers of the Championship. On 18 August 2012, he made his league debut for Rovers against Ipswich Town coming on as an 83rd-minute substitute for Danny Murphy.

International career
Paulo Jorge has represented Portugal at under-17 and twice at under-19 level. He played 90 minutes for the U19s in a 6–0 win away at San Marino on 6 November 2011 and came on as substitute in a 3–3 draw at home to Hungary three days later.

Career statistics

Club

References

External links
 
 
 

1993 births
Living people
Sportspeople from Braga
Portuguese footballers
Association football midfielders
Portugal youth international footballers
S.C. Braga players
FC Porto players
Blackburn Rovers F.C. players
CS Gaz Metan Mediaș players
C.D. Trofense players
S.C. Espinho players
English Football League players
Regionalliga players
Liga I players
Portuguese expatriate footballers
Campeonato de Portugal (league) players
Expatriate footballers in England
Portuguese expatriate sportspeople in England
Expatriate footballers in Germany
Portuguese expatriate sportspeople in Germany
Expatriate footballers in Romania
Portuguese expatriate sportspeople in Romania